Elm Grove is an unincorporated community at the northern edge of Wharton County, in the U.S. state of Texas. The very small community is situated on Farm to Market Road 2614 (FM 2614) to the south of Eagle Lake which is in Colorado County.

History
In 1912, there was a school for African-American children in the community. A 1936 county roadmap noted that there was a school and several homes in the area. By the 1980s there were still two commercial establishments, a few houses, a cemetery and a church.

Geography
FM 2614 at County Road 267. The addresses in the area all bear the same zip code as Eagle Lake, 77434. FM 2614 crosses the Colorado County line a short distance to the west. Garwood in Colorado County is to the west of Elm Grove, as is the Colorado River.

Notes

Unincorporated communities in Wharton County, Texas
Unincorporated communities in Texas